Ananda Gopal Mukhopadhyay (27 November 1926 – ?), was an Indian National Congress politician.

Early life
The son of Basanta Kumar Mukhopadhyay, he was born at Bhiringhi (now in Durgapur) on 27 November 1926. He graduated in science.

Political career
In 1951 he was elected to the West Bengal Legislative Assembly (Vidhan Sabha) from Ausgram (Vidhan Sabha constituency). In 1957 he was elected from the Ondal constituency. In 1962 and 1972 he was elected from the then newly formed Durgapur constituency.

Ananda Gopal Mukhopadhayay was elected to the Indian Parliament (Lok Sabha) in 1980 and 1984, from Asansol (Lok Sabha constituency).

He was president, West Bengal Pradesh Congress Committee; member, INTUC Central Executive Committee; vice-president, Indian National Metal Workers Federation (INTUC); president, All India National General Insurance Employees Association (INTUC); director, Durgapur Projects Ltd. and Durgapur Chemicals Ltd., 1972–76.

References

Mukhopadhyay, Ananda Gopal
Mukhopadhyay, Ananda Gopal
Mukhopadhyay, Ananda Gopal
Mukherjee, Ananda Gopal